Yazgeldi is a village in the Nazımiye District, Tunceli Province, Turkey. The village is populated by Kurds of the Kurêşan tribe and had a population of 51 in 2021.

The hamlets of Akçalı, Akyaprak, Başağaç, Kargılı, Kuşkondu, Kuyucak and Paşakule are attached to the village.

References 

Villages in Nazımiye District
Kurdish settlements in Tunceli Province